Lev Nikolayevich Mayorov (13 October 1969 – 1 February 2020) was an Azerbaijani professional football coach and player. He died on 1 February 2020.

Club career
He played 2 games in the UEFA Cup 2001–02 for FC Chernomorets Novorossiysk.

References

External links
 
 

1969 births
2020 deaths
Footballers from Baku
Soviet footballers
Azerbaijani footballers
Association football midfielders
Azerbaijan international footballers
Russian Premier League players
FC Kuban Krasnodar players
FC Chernomorets Novorossiysk players
Azerbaijani football managers
Azerbaijani expatriate footballers
Expatriate footballers in Russia
Azerbaijani expatriate football managers
Expatriate football managers in Russia
FC Slavyansk Slavyansk-na-Kubani players